Ruth Elizabeth Worsley,  (born 1962) is a Church of England bishop. Since September 2015, she has been the Bishop of Taunton, a suffragan bishop of the Diocese of Bath and Wells. From 2013 to 2015, she was Archdeacon of Wiltshire.

Early life
Worsley was born in 1962 in Hampton, Middlesex. She studied English literature, theology and biblical studies at the University of Manchester. She was training to be a nurse when she felt the call to ministry and left to take up a position as a lay minister. She trained for ordained ministry at St John's College, Nottingham, an Anglican theological college.

Ordained ministry
Worsley was ordained in the Church of England: made a deacon at Michaelmas 1996 (29 September) by Patrick Harris, Bishop of Southwell at St Mary's Church, Nottingham and ordained a priest the Michaelmas following (5 October 1997), by Alan Morgan, Bishop of Sherwood at St Peter's Church, Ravenshead. She served curacies at St Leodegarius Church, Basford (1996 to 1998) and St Stephen's Church, Hyson Green (1998 to 2001) in Nottingham. From 2001 to 2008, she was priest-in-charge of the benefice of Hyson Green (St Stephen's Church) and Forest Fields. She was also Area Dean of Nottingham North between 2006 and 2008.

From 2007 to 2010, Worsley was Dean of Women's Ministry in the Diocese of Southwell and Nottingham and an honorary canon of Southwell Minster. In 2009 she was appointed an Honorary Chaplain to the Queen; and in 2010 to the post of Parish Development Officer for the Woolwich Area of the Diocese of Southwark. In February 2013, she was appointed Archdeacon of Wilts. She stood down as archdeacon upon becoming a bishop.

Episcopal ministry
On 30 June 2015, she was announced as the next Bishop of Taunton, a suffragan bishop in the Diocese of Bath and Wells. On 29 September 2015, she was consecrated a bishop by Justin Welby, Archbishop of Canterbury, during a service at St Paul's Cathedral, London. She was installed as Bishop of Taunton at Wells Cathedral on 2 October. Her first act as a bishop was to admit and licence nine people as readers.

Personal life
Worsley is married to Howard who is also ordained in the Church of England. Together, they have three children; Nathanael, Jonathan and Benjamin.

References

1962 births
Honorary Chaplains to the Queen
Archdeacons of Wilts
Living people
Alumni of the University of Manchester
Women Anglican bishops